Shapland & Petter were architectural doorset manufacturers in Barnstaple, Devon, England before being taken over by the LS Group in 1999.
Before takeover, Shapland & Petter was the largest privately owned employer in Devon, with a staff of approximately 900 during the 1990s. All operations at Barnstaple finally ceased in 2016 as the LS Group was wound up and the riverfront site was earmarked for redevelopment as a superstore.

History
Henry Shapland had been apprenticed to a cabinet maker in Barnstaple, before travelling to America in 1851 and learning about a wave moulding machine. Back in England he was joined by Henry Petter. By 1888 the Raleigh Cabinet Works were employing hundreds of workers from Raleigh and the surrounding areas when on 5 March 1888 a fire destroyed the factory. The factory was restarted at a new site on the River Taw, a former shipbuilding yard known as Bridge Wharf. Working together as Shapland and Petter they were to become one of the town's largest employers. Although much of their output was "Arts and Crafts" in design in no way did it emulate the aspirations of William Morris, et al. They employed craftsmen but also used the most up-to-date machinery available for their products. Henry Shapland was a time-served cabinet maker and Henry Petter was an amazing salesman who found the market for their products.

During World War I the firm produced shell cases, ammunition boxes and aeroplane propellers in addition to their normal furniture production.

A collection of the company's products is displayed at the Museum of Barnstaple and North Devon.

References
See Daryl Bennett's book "Shapland and Petter" 2006.
See Pauline Brain's book "Some men who made Barnstaple..." and "Arts & Crafts in Barnstaple" 2010

Furniture companies of England
Companies based in Devon
British furniture makers